Marduk Kurios is a character appearing in American comic books published by Marvel Comics. He is a demon who has repeatedly posed as Satan, and is the father of Daimon Hellstrom and Satana Hellstrom.

Marduk appeared in the Hulu television series Helstrom, played by Mitch Pileggi.

Fictional character biography
Marduk Kurios is a high level demon and the ruler of one realm of Hell. Like many other demons, he has falsely taken on the titles of Satan, Lucifer and the devil to further strengthen his power and devotion. It was revealed that he was actually the Biblical Lucifer of the Abrahamic religions, as the N'Garai told his daughter Satana when they were hunting her in revenge that, in prehistoric times, her father repelled their invasion of Earth as the head of Heaven's army.  In ancient times, the Sumerians worshipped Marduk after seeing a previous battle his legions of Hell took part in on Earth. Intrigued by this new worship, he kept track of the mortal realm over the centuries. He became enamoured by a family of Satanists named Hellstrom and took the shape of one of them. In this guise he married the mortal woman Victoria Wingate and soon after moved to Lake Fire, Massachusetts. There, Victoria gave birth to Daimon Hellstrom, and a year and a half later gave birth again, this time to Satana Hellstrom. Over the years, Marduk could see that his son did not care for his dark family legacy and instead lavished affection to his daughter, who did. While performing a ritual with Satana involving animal sacrifice, Victoria accidentally walked in and discovered Marduk's true nature. Driven insane, Victoria spent the remainder of her life in an asylum where she kept a diary she meant to give to Daimon once he was old enough to understand.

Marduk took Satana with him to his Hell-realm while he left Daimon on Earth to be cared for by servants. Upon his 21st birthday Marduk invited his son to rule by his side, offering eternal life and power incarnate. Daimon rejected his father's offer and stole Marduk's netheranium trident, taking with him a portion of Marduk's power. Thus, the rivalry between father and son began.

Marduk then tested Satana's loyalty by having her battle the Four, a group of sorcerers. Killing all four of them, she discovered that her father was behind the plot. When she was confronted by him, Satana failed to kill Michael Heron, one of her new allies, in honor of her father. This angered Marduk and he banished Satana to remain on Earth until her first mortal death.

In a battle with the Defenders, Daimon's evil soul was released and he agreed to serve his father in Hell. During Daimon's final training, Marduk asked Daimon to kill a human in his honor. When Daimon failed to comply Marduk revealed that, although he has lived under many faces over the centuries, not all of them have been evil. He told Daimon that he was secretly pleased with his choice but then banished him to Earth, no longer under his care.

Daimon eventually learned his father's true name from the witch Lavoisin. When next he confronted his father, he used this name, received a black halo over his head and became the new ruler of his father's realm in Hell. 

Greatly reduced in power, Marduk tricked the warlock Andrew Kale into opening The Tome of Zhered-Na (a powerful Book of Shadows belonging to the Kale family). In doing so, the demon Hellphyr was released. The Hellphyr then began to attack various magical persons to steal their power and kill them shortly afterward. In causing this, Marduk had hoped to rid the world of a good percentage of its magic users in order for him to acquire a better rank among magic's stairway. Marduk offered Satana the opportunity to help him in this scheme and thus receive a higher standing herself in the realm of magic. Refusing his offer, Satana killed the Hellphyr with the help of her fellow witches Jennifer Kale (Andrew's sister) and Topaz. In doing so, Marduk made enemies of both his children as he searched for another way to regain his previous level of power.

Despite the continuing conflict he has with his children, it was revealed that Marduk still receives offerings of human souls from his daughter Satana. For every nine victims' souls she devours, she offers her 10th victim's soul to her father.

During the Chaos War story line, Marduk is among the entities (and is confirmed to indeed apparently be in fact the most powerful demon in Hell, as the Chaos King called him "the Devil powered by all of Hell's fire") that are defeated by Amatsu-Mikaboshi and added to the ranks of his army of slave gods.

During the Fear Itself story line, Marduk Kurios attended the Devil's Advocacy, where the Hell-Lords talked about the Serpent's actions on Earth. Marduk Kurios taunted Mephisto during this meeting.

Powers and abilities
Not much is known about Marduk Kurios' powers, but they are mentioned to be more powerful in his realm of Hell than on Earth.

In other media
 The character, identified as "Papa", plays a behind the scenes-type role in the series Helstrom. His children, Daimon and Ana Helstrom, try to prevent his return. He appears in the season 1 finale, portrayed by Mitch Pileggi, where he recruits his daughter Kthara, whom he refers to as Lily.

References

External links

Comics characters introduced in 1974
Marvel Comics devils
Marvel Comics supervillains